Emily Owens, M.D. is an American medical drama television series created by Jennie Snyder Urman. It was picked up by The CW on May 11, 2012. It premiered on The CW on October 16, 2012, and aired on Tuesdays at 9:00 pm Eastern/8:00 pm Central.

On November 28, 2012, the series was canceled by The CW. The thirteenth and final episode aired on February 5, 2013.

Plot
The series followed the life of Emily Owens (Mamie Gummer) when she finally feels like she is a grown-up. She can finally put her high school days as the geeky girl with flop-sweats behind her. She's graduated from medical school, and she's beginning an internship at Denver Memorial Hospital, where, not-so-coincidentally, her med-school crush Will Collins (Justin Hartley) is also an intern.

She soon finds out the hard way that her high school nemesis, the gorgeous, popular and manipulative Cassandra Kopelson (Aja Naomi King) is also a new intern at Denver Memorial. Another fellow intern, Tyra Dupre (Kelly McCreary) warns Emily that the cliques at the hospital are all too familiar: the jocks have become orthopedic surgeons; the mean girls are in plastics; the rebels are in the ER; the stoners and slackers are anesthesiologists; nerds and geeks are neurologists, and Tyra has her own awkward place as the principal's kid – her father, Dr. Tim Dupre (Harry Lennix) is the Chief of Medicine. Tyra latches onto Emily as a new friend, and immediately begins confiding in her – the fact that Tyra is a lesbian, that she is interested in dating a certain nurse – nothing is too personal for Tyra to share with Emily.

She may have made one new friend, but it doesn't take long for Emily to realize that the long-standing rivalry she had with Cassandra back in high school is only going to grow. Now, both Emily and Cassandra are competing to impress the brilliant but stern and intolerant Dr. Gina Bandari (Necar Zadegan), a world-famous cardiothoracic surgeon who has been an inspiration and role model to both of them for years. While Emily and Cassandra vie for Dr. Bandari's approval, they're also competing for Will's attention. Will and Emily were friends in med school, although his handsome face and charming personality left Emily hoping for more. Will has made it clear, however, that he likes their relationship the way it is. Emily struggles to convince herself that being friends with Will is enough, but she has to admit it bothers her just to see Will and Cassandra talking together.

Meanwhile, Emily is also getting to know the slightly needy, but smart and handsome resident Dr. Micah Barnes (Michael Rady). Micah is faced with serious medical issues within his own family, and Emily's compassion proves an invaluable help. Impressed with Emily's medical skills, and warm bedside manner, Micah brings her in on a delicate surgery and talks her through the procedure, boosting her confidence and bringing them closer-both professionally and personally.

Even with the long hours, the heavy workload, and no shortage of personal drama filling her first days as an intern, Emily still feels like she's the new geeky kid all over again, and it's just as awkward as high school. At Denver Memorial, Emily is just beginning to learn that although she may be an insecure and socially awkward geek, she may also grow to be a great doctor, flop sweats and all.

Cast and characters

Main cast and characters
 Mamie Gummer as Emily Owens; the series' protagonist. A first-year surgical intern at Denver Memorial Hospital, who was ready to put her high-school days behind her. However, Emily quickly discovered that the hospital was just like high school and that it might be hard to shake her insecure, geeky-girl ways, especially in the presence of her high school nemesis and med-school crush.
 Justin Hartley as Will Collins; A handsome and charming first-year surgical intern at Denver Memorial Hospital, who was a former friend of Emily's from medical school and who is oblivious that she has a crush on him.
 Aja Naomi King as Cassandra Kopelson; the series' primary antagonist. The gorgeous and popular first-year surgical intern Cassandra Kopelson, who just happens to be Emily's high-school nemesis. Charming and charismatic in public, but cold and manipulative in private, and somewhat soulless, Cassandra is determined to take everything that Emily has and wants for herself as well as lie, cheat, steal, push and shove to further advance up the ranks of the hospital.
 Kelly McCreary as Tyra Dupre; A first-year surgical intern, who quickly befriends Emily and also had the misfortune of being the daughter of the chief of surgery. Her father doesn't know that she's a lesbian.
 Michael Rady as Micah Barnes; A smart and handsome resident, who was responsible for the interns and takes Emily under his wing.
 Necar Zadegan as Gina Bandari; The tough-as-nails world-famous cardiothoracic surgeon, the doctor who both inspires and intimidates all the interns.

Recurring cast and characters
 Julia Sarah Stone as Abbey
 J.R. Ramirez as Dr. A.J. Aquino
 Harry Lennix as Tim Dupre
 Mark Ghanimé as Dr. Jamie Albagetti
 Michelle Harrison as Jessica
 Catherine Barroll as Joyce Barnes 
 Christine Willes as E.R. Nurse
 Brittany Ishibashi as Dr. Kelly Hamata
 Christian Tessier as Leo

Development and production
In May 2012, The CW placed an order for the series under the original title First Cut. The pilot was available on CWTV.com, Facebook, Twitter, YouTube, Hulu, iTunes, and on Mobile App, about three weeks before its premiere on The CW, and on YouTube a week before the premiere. The series was shot in Vancouver, British Columbia, Canada, notably at Burnaby Central Secondary School and the University of British Columbia.

Episodes

Ratings

Reception
E! Online described it as a mix between Grey's Anatomy and Mean Girls. On the review aggregator website Metacritic, the show scored 47/100. Three years after the show was cancelled, the CW president Mark Pedowitz stated that the failure of the show helped the network realise what type of show their audience wanted, which enabled them to start ordering more shows that were like that. The realization would ultimately help improve overall ratings and critical reception for the network.

Awards and nominations
At the 34th Young Artist Awards the show won the award for "Best Performance in a TV Series – Guest Starring Young Actor Ten and Under" for Bruce Salomon.

International broadcasts
The series was picked up in Canada by CTV Two and aired in simulcast. Network Ten planned to air the series in Australia. ETC aired the series in the Philippines.

In Hong Kong and the Netherlands, the series aired on TVB Pearl and Net5, respectively. In the United Kingdom, it will be shown weekly on Really from August 19, 2013 onwards. In Italy, it was shown daily on Rai 3 from August 11 to August 23, 2013. In France, TF6 broadcast the show on March 6, 2014 and M6 broadcast the show on March 24, 2014.

References

External links

2010s American comedy-drama television series
2012 American television series debuts
2013 American television series endings
2010s American LGBT-related drama television series
2010s American medical television series
English-language television shows
Television shows filmed in Vancouver
Television series by CBS Studios
Television series by Warner Bros. Television Studios
Television shows set in Colorado
The CW original programming